Brief Guide To A Happy Life is a Russian sixteen serial television series, filmed by director Valeriya Gai Germanika and with a scenario by Anna Kozlova. It was aired on Channel One Russia from 12 March to 5 April 2012.

Plot 
The series tells the story of four young women working in the recruiting agency New recruit  their families and relations with men.

Sasha is lonely and single. She is divorced, lives with her young son, mother and grandmother. When she meets Pyotr, who would later become her boss and lover, a new period begins in my life.

Not everything is perfect with her new colleagues either. The secretary Anya is busy searching for her second half. Lyuba is deciding how to deal with the fact that she is not able to have children, and Katya is mired in a family home which she can no longer tolerate.

Cast
Svetlana Khodchenkova as Sasha
Ksenia Gromova as Katya 
Alisa Khazanova as Lyuba 
 Anna Slyu as Anya
Kirill Safonov as Pyotr Alekseevich Shirokov
 Alexey Barabash as Dima
 Kirill Zhandarov as Sergey
 Yekaterina Volkova as Polina
  Alexandra Nazarova as Bella
 Yola Sanko as Emma
 Sergey Burunov as Timur
 Igor Zolotovitsky as Alexander, lawyer
 Alisa Priznyakova as Natasha
Roman Volobuev as Jura, a serial killer
 Valery Barinov as Vladimir Ivanovich
 Valeriya Gai Germanika as Ms. Fedora, clairvoyant
 Valentin Smirnitsky as Ilya Ilych
 Agniya Kuznetsova as girl
 Irina Khakamada as Vera Rodinka, psychologist
 Ksenia Sobchak as Nadya
 Valeria Kudryavtseva as Svetlana
 Tatyana Lyutaeva as Olga
 Bianka as cameo

Soundtrack 

In the series are performed by the composition of Eva Polna, Zveri, Yolka, Slava, Yulia Chicherina, NikitA, Linda, DJ Smash, Timati, Vintage, Noize MC, Auktyon, BoomBox, Bianka, Sergey Shnurov, Oskar Kuchera, Grigory Leps, Smyslovye Gallyutsinatsii, Irina Bogushevskaya, Brainstorm and others.

References

External links

 Страница сериала на сайте «Первого канала»
Brief Guide To A Happy Life at the KinoPoisk

Russian-language television shows
2010s Russian television series
2012 Russian television series debuts
2012 Russian television series endings
Russian drama television series
Channel One Russia original programming
Television shows set in Moscow
Erotic drama television series